Brunersburg is an unincorporated community in Defiance County, Ohio.

History
Brunersburg was platted in 1834 by Daniel Bruner, and named for him. A post office was established at Brunersburg in 1837, and remained in operation until 1895.

References

Unincorporated communities in Defiance County, Ohio
Unincorporated communities in Ohio